Plácido Reynaldo Galindo Pando  (9 March 1906 – 22 October 1988) was a Peruvian football midfielder who played for Peru in the 1930 FIFA World Cup, where he also became the first ever player sent off in a World Cup match. He also was a player, manager and president of Universitario de Deportes.

Universitario de Deportes 

Plácido Galindo played for Universitario de Deportes from 1924 to 1933. As part of a group of students of the University of San Marcos he founded the then called Federación Universitaria de Fútbol in 1924. The club played friendly matches until it was admitted in the first Peruvian Primera División tournament in 1928, in which it ended as runner up. The next year Galindo and the club won the 1929 Peruvian Primera División.

Galindo was part of the Peru-Chile XI, a squad of Peruvian and Chilean footballers of Alianza Lima, Atlético Chalaco, Colo-Colo and Universitario de Deportes that played 39 friendly matches in Europe between September 1933 and March 1934. His last match was against a Madrid XI on 8 December 1933.

With Galindo as manager, Universitario won the 1934 Peruvian Primera División.

Galindo was president of Universitario in 1954-1956, 1956-1958 and 1958-1963. During his presidency the club won the 1959 and 1960 Peruvian titles.

Peru National Football Team 

Peru national football team coach Francisco Bru called Galindo to the Peruvian squad for the 1930 FIFA World Cup. Galindo also took part in the 1929 South American Championship.

References

External links

FIFA profile

1906 births
1988 deaths
Footballers from Lima
Peruvian footballers
Peru international footballers
Association football midfielders
Peruvian Primera División players
Club Universitario de Deportes footballers
1930 FIFA World Cup players